Souessa is a monotypic genus of North American sheet weavers containing the single species, Souessa spinifera. It was first described by C. R. Crosby & S. C. Bishop in 1936, and has only been found in the United States.

See also
 List of Linyphiidae species (Q–Z)

References

Linyphiidae
Monotypic Araneomorphae genera
Spiders of the United States